Oxyptilus is a genus of moths in the family Pterophoridae described by Philipp Christoph Zeller in 1841.

Species

Oxyptilus catathectes
Oxyptilus causodes Meyrick, 1905
Oxyptilus celebratus
Oxyptilus chrysodactyla
Oxyptilus cinctipedalis
Oxyptilus delawaricus
Oxyptilus epidectis Meyrick, 1908
Oxyptilus erebites
Oxyptilus ericetorum
Oxyptilus erythrodactylus D. S. Fletcher, 1911
Oxyptilus idonealis
Oxyptilus insomnis
Oxyptilus mycites
Oxyptilus orichalcias
Oxyptilus parvidactyla
Oxyptilus pilosellae
Oxyptilus praedator
Oxyptilus regulus
Oxyptilus scutifer
Oxyptilus secutor
Oxyptilus variegatus
Oxyptilus wallecei

Former species included in this genus are:
Oxyptilus anthites Meyrick, 1936

References

Oxyptilini
Moth genera
Taxa named by Philipp Christoph Zeller